The Legal Profession Admission Board is the statutory authority responsible for the admission of lawyers in New South Wales. It was formerly two separate boards; the Barristers Admission Board and the Solicitors Admission Board. The Legal Profession Act 1993 introduced common admission for both branches of the profession resulting in the merger of the two boards.

The board has responsibility for accrediting academic and practical legal training courses leading to admission as a lawyer. The board is also tasked with the responsibility of ensuring that candidates for admission are of good character. In addition to accrediting University courses, the board also conducts examinations leading to a Diploma in Law. The board's Diploma is the equivalent of an accredited law degree and satisfies the academic requirements for admission to the profession. This course is the oldest law course in Australia, dating back to 1848.

Notable alumni
Former Justice Michael McHugh of the High Court of Australia 
Victor Dominello NSW Finance minister
Ian Barker, barrister and former NSW Chair of the Bar Association
John Abernethy Former State Coroner for NSW
Reginald Marr Solicitor-General for NSW
David Opas Assassinated Family Court judge
Rear Admiral Harold Farncomb, navy officer
John Purdy, Family court judge, chess player
Kevin Rozzoli, Speaker of the Legislative Assembly of NSW
Lionel Murphy, Attorney-General of Australia
Bronwyn Bishop
Justice Stephen Campbell, NSW Supreme Court 
Justice Carolyn Simpson, NSW Supreme Court
Justice Geoffrey Bellew NSW Supreme Court 
Justice Robert Hulme, NSW Supreme Court
Justice Peter Hamill, NSW Supreme Court

References

External links
 Legal Profession Admission Board

New South Wales law
Legal education in Australia
Legal professions